Ged Byrne (born 14 June 1962) is a former professional rugby league footballer who played in the 1980s and 1990s.

Playing career
Byrne started his career at Salford. In 1987, he left Salford to join Wigan for a fee of £40,000.

Byrne made his début for Wigan in the 44-12 victory over Halifax in the Charity Shield during the 1987–88 season at Okells Bowl, Douglas, Isle of Man on 23 August 1987, he scored his first try for Wigan in the 26-8 victory over Station Road, Swinton on 6 September 1987, he scored his last try in his last match for Wigan was the 34-6 victory over Leigh at Central Park, Wigan on 16 April 1990.

World Club Challenge
Ged Byrne was an  interchange/substitute in Wigan's 8-2 victory over Manly-Warringah Sea Eagles in the 1987 World Club Challenge at Central Park, Wigan on Wednesday 7 October 1987.

Championship appearances
Ged Byrne played in Wigan's victory in the Championship during the 1989–90 season.

Challenge Cup Final appearances
Ged Byrne was an  interchange/substitute in Wigan's 32-12 victory over Halifax in the 1988 Challenge Cup Final during the 1987–88 season at Wembley Stadium, London on Saturday 30 April 1988.

County Cup Final appearances
Ged Byrne played as an  interchange/substitute, i.e. number 14, (replacing  Joe Lydon in the 76th minute) in Wigan's 22-17 victory over Salford in the 1988 Lancashire County Cup Final during the 1988–89 season at Knowsley Road, St. Helens on Sunday 23 October 1988.

John Player Trophy Final appearances
Ged Byrne played  in Wigan's 12-6 victory over Widnes in the 1988–89 John Player Special Trophy Final during the 1988–89 season at Burnden Park, Bolton on Saturday 7 January 1989.

References

External links
 Statistics at rugbyleagueproject.org
 Ged Byrne at Oldham Rugby League Heritage Trust

1962 births
Living people
English rugby league players
Place of birth missing (living people)
Rugby league centres
Rugby league wingers
Rugby league five-eighths
Salford Red Devils players
Wakefield Trinity players
Wigan Warriors players
Oldham R.L.F.C. players
Workington Town players